Metropolitan Hilarion or Ilarion may refer to:

 Hilarion of Kiev, 11th century Russian churchman, became Metropolitan of Kiev
 Hilarion (Alfeyev) (born 1966), metropolitan of Budapest and Hungary, former chairman of the Department of External Church Relations of the Patriarchate of Moscow; theologian, church historian and composer
 Hilarion (Kapral) (born 1948) Metropolitan of Eastern America and New York, First-Hierarch of the Russian Orthodox Church Outside Russia
 Hilarion (Ohienko) (1882–1972), Ukrainian churchman, became Metropolitan of Canada
 Hilarion (Rudnyk) (born 1972), Metropolitan of the autonomous Ukrainian Orthodox Church of Canada
 Hilarion (Serafimovski) (born 1973), Metropolitan of Diocese of Bregalica, Republic of Macedonia

See also 

 Hilarion (name)
 Ilarion